Mohandas may refer to:

People
 Mohandas Karamchand Gandhi or Mahatma Gandhi (1869–1948), major political and spiritual leader of India
 Achuth Mohandas, Indian writer in both English and Malayalam and a radio jockey
 Geetu Mohandas (born 1981), Indian actress
 Mamta Mohandas (born 1985), Indian actress
 P. M. K. Mohandas (1948–2004), Indian cricketer
 P. V. A. Mohandas, Indian orthopedic surgeon

Other uses
 Mohandas (2008 film), a Hindi drama film by Mazhar Kamran
 Mohandas (2019 film), Indian biographical film about the childhood of Mahatma Gandhi in English, Hindi and Kannada and directed by P. Sheshadri
 Mohandas B.A.L.L.B., Indian TV show broadcast on Zee TV in 1997-1998

See also
Muhandes (disambiguation)